is a 2004 Japanese anime series based on the manga of the same name by Mitsuteru Yokoyama. It was animated by Genco and Palm Studio and written and directed by Yasuhiro Imagawa. The series has been released in the United States under its original name by Geneon and in the United Kingdom by Manga Entertainment, the first time a Tetsujin-28 property has not been localized to Gigantor in America or other English speaking nations. It was then rescued by Discotek Media for a SD Blu-ray release on September 25, 2018, with the movie (being released as Morning Moon of Midday) released on sub-only Blu-ray + DVD Combo Pack on January 29, 2019. While not fully based on the original manga, it followed an extremely different storyline than in the 1960s series.

Plot
The story takes place ten years after World War II, approximately the same time as the manga debuted, focused mainly on Shotaro's pursuit to control and fully understand Tetsujin's capabilities, all the while encountering previous creations and scientists from the Tetsujin Project.

Cast

Shotaro Kaneda 
Professor Shikishima 
Chief Ootsuka 
Kenji Murasame 
Dr. Furanken

Episodes

Video game
On July 1, 2004, a video game was released for the PlayStation 2 developed by Sandlot and published by Bandai. In it you control Tetsujin 28 from the point of view of Shotaro Kaneda. The control method is slightly simplified compared to Sandlot's other giant robot games such as Robot Alchemic Drive, allowing you to fly Tetsujin 28, and well as have him pick up buildings, enemies, and even Shotaro to safely transport him away from a battle zone. The game uses the same voice actors from the series, though it takes presentation cues from the original 1950's manga, as well as the kaiju film genre.

Reception

The series got a mostly positive reception from critics.

References

External links
 
 

2004 anime television series debuts
Action anime and manga
Adventure anime and manga
Dieselpunk
Discotek Media
Geneon USA
Science fiction anime and manga
Super robot anime and manga
Tetsujin 28-go
TV Tokyo original programming